The Charents Museum of Literature and Arts is the largest repository of Armenian manuscripts and books encompassing the last three hundred years, located in Yerevan, Armenia.

History 
Originally conceived in 1954 as the Museum of Literature and Arts of Armenian Soviet Socialist Republic, the institution has evolved into a notable research center, where the archives of some six hundred Armenian authors, playwrights and musicians are presently housed. Beginning with 1967, the Museum has been named after the Armenian poet Yeghishe Charents.

In addition to the manuscripts and its extensive library, the Museum owns numerous photographs, posters, drafts, outfits, theatrical items, personal artifacts and musical instruments, that lend a comprehensive view of the life of the artists. Some this material is on display at the large exhibition hall of the institute.

The Museum publishes academic books and devotes special presentations to Armenian literary figures. Its present director is Karo Vardanyan.

References

Museums established in 1921
Literary museums in Armenia
Biographical museums in Armenia
Museums in Yerevan
Archives in Armenia
Armenian literature